Performing arts – are art forms where the participant engages in a physical performance using their body, voice, language, or use of specific equipment for entertainment purposes.

What are performing arts? 
The performing arts as a whole can be described as all of the following:

 Art – aesthetic expression for presentation or performance, and the work produced from this activity.
 One of the arts – an outlet of human expression that is influenced by culture and which in turn helps to change culture. The performing arts are a physical manifestation of the internal human creative impulse.
 A form of storytelling that has been practiced since the beginning of time.

Common performing arts
 Acrobatics – performance of extraordinary feats of balance, agility and motor coordination.
 Baton twirling
 Majorettes
 Busking 
 Circus
 Circus arts
 Comedy 
 Dance – art of movement of the body, usually rhythmically and to music, using prescribed or improvised steps and gestures. "A dance" is any one prescribed sequence of such movements, or the music to which it is performed, or an event at which it takes place.
 Competitive dance
 Dance squad
 Ice dance
 Drama
 Free skating
 Ice show
 Juggling 
 Magic 
 Marching arts 
 Color guard
 Drum and bugle corps
 Indoor percussion ensemble
 Marching band
 Pep band
 Winter guard
 Music 
 Jazz 
 Opera – performance where art, architecture, music, theater, text, and cloth designing are put together to present a story to the audience
 Puppetry
 Storytelling – conveying of events in words, images and sounds, often by improvisation or embellishment. Stories or narratives have been shared in every culture as a means of entertainment, education, cultural preservation and in order to instill moral values.
 Acting 
 Film 
 Theatre
 Musical theatre
 Plays
 Ventriloquism

History of performing arts

History of acrobatics
History of busking
History of circus
History of dance
History of ballet
History of film
History of juggling
History of magic
History of marching bands
History of music
History of opera
History of theatre

Contents of a work of performing art 
 Role
 Dual role
 Stock character
 Title role
 Special effects
 Stage combat

Venue types 
 Arena
 Arts centre
 Auditorium
 Cabaret
 Cultural center
 Dance venues
 Ballroom
 Dance club
 Dance hall
 Dance studio
 Music venues
 Bandstand
 Bar
 Coffeehouse
 Concert hall
 Jazz club
 Live house
 Nightclub
 Opera house
 Performing arts center
 Pub
 Stadium
 Stage
 Amphitheatre
 Black box theater
 Proscenium
 Site-specific theatre
 Theatre in the round
 Thrust stage
 Traverse stage
 Theater (structure)

Participants 

 Actor
 Character actor – one who predominantly plays a particular type of role rather than leading ones. Character actor roles can range from bit parts to secondary leads.
 Leading actor
 Artistic director
 Assistant stage manager
 Audience
 Audio engineer
 Ballet master
 Bandleader
 Call boy
 Carpenter
 Charge scenic artist
 Choreographer
 Composer
 Conductor
 Costume designer
 Dancer
 Dramaturge
 Dresser
 Electrician
 Film director
 Fly crew
 Light board operator
 Lighting designer
 Lighting technician
 Master electrician
 Movement director
 Music director
 Musician
 Singer
 Playwright
 Production manager
 Production team
 Property master
 Rigger
 Running crew
 Scenographer
 Scriptwriter
 Set designer
 Sound designer
 Spotlight operator
 Stagehand
 Stage manager
 Technical director
 Theater manager
 Theatre director
 Theatrical producer
 Theatrical technician
 Usher
 Wardrobe supervisor

Production activities 
  Audition
 Casting
 Choreography
 Costume design
 Dramaturgy
 House management
 Musical composition
 Rehearsal
 Scenic design
 Scenic painting
 Set construction
 Sound design
 Stagecraft
 Stage lighting
 Staging

External links

 Bibliography of Performing Arts In The East

Performing arts
Performing arts
 1
Performing arts